Lineham may refer to:

Edwin Lineham (1879–1949), English first-class cricketer
John Lineham (1857–1913), politician and businessman from Northwest Territories, Canada
Kimberly Lineham (born 1962), American former competition swimmer and former world record-holder
Tania Lineham (1966–2018), New Zealand science teacher who won the 2015 Prime Minister's Science Teacher Prize
Tom Lineham (born 1991), English professional rugby league footballer

See also
Lyneham (disambiguation)
Kwik-Fit (GB) Ltd v Lineham, UK labour law case concerning unfair dismissal
Lineham Discovery Well No. 1, defunct oil well and national historic site of Canada